Estrus Records is an independent record label from Bellingham, Washington that makes surf, garage and trash rock music.

They have released such bands as Mono Men, The Drags, The Mummies, Supercharger, Impala, Man or Astro-man?, the Makers, 5.6.7.8's, Gas Huffer, Mooney Suzuki, Soledad Brothers, DMBQ, The Cherry Valence, Midnight Evils, Federation X, The Trashwomen, Satan's Pilgrims, The Von Zippers, Tricky Woo, Untamed Youth, Immortal Lee County Killers, The Dexateens, Marble Orchard, The Mortals and Southern Culture on the Skids.

For many years Estrus hosted an annual festival, Garage Shock, at The 3B Tavern in Bellingham. Garage Shock featured bands from the labels roster, as well as others from around the world. The last Garage Shock, in 2001, was held at Emo's, in Austin, Texas.

In January 1997, their entire mail-order inventory, private record collection, and some band gear were destroyed in a warehouse fire.

At the start of 2020 work began on a giant book about Estrus Records to be published by Korero Press, titled Estrus: Shovelin’ the Shit Since ’87.

A monthly podcast dedicated to Estrus Records called PodShock started to be broadcast in anticipation of the release of the book in April 2020.  Episode one featured Eric Friedl of The Oblivians and Goner Records along with members of The Fells. Episode two featured Mort of The Mono Men and Dave Holmes of The Fall-Outs.

Suggested listening 
 26 Excellennt Estrus Sizzlers (Estrus Records) (1999) - sampler
 Estrus 100% Apeshit Rock Sampler (Vol. 2) (Estrus Records) (2000)
 Estrus Double Dynomite Sampler Vol. 3 (Estrus Records) (2002)

See also 
 List of record labels

References

External links
Official site
PodShock – The Estrus Records Podcast

American independent record labels
Garage rock record labels
Record labels established in 1990
Companies based in Bellingham, Washington
Alternative rock record labels